Eric Vandeperre (25 March 1957 – 30 March 2010) was a Belgian racing cyclist. He rode in the 1981 Tour de France.

References

1957 births
2010 deaths
Belgian male cyclists
Place of birth missing